Tabernaemontana peschiera is a species of plant in the family Apocynaceae. It is found in northern Brazil, Suriname, and French Guinea.

References

peschiera
Undescribed plant species